Titou  is a French nickname (or surname) that is a diminutive form of Titouan used in France, Switzerland, Belgium, Canada, West Greenland, Haiti, French Guiana, Madagascar, Benin, Niger, Burkina Faso, Ivory Coast, Guinea, Senegal, Mauritania, Western Sahara, Morocco, Algeria, Tunisia, Chad, Central African Republic, Cameroon, Equatorial Guinea, Gabon, Republic of the Congo, Democratic Republic of the Congo, Burundi, and Rwanda. Notable people with this nickname include the following:

 Christophe "Titou" Lamaison (born 1971), French rugby union player
 Souad Titou (born 1986), Algerian handball player
 Titou Le Lapinou, fictional French singer, a rabbit (active in 2006–2008)

See also 

 Tito (disambiguation)
Titouan

Notes